Black Cat is a 2007 Indian Malayalam action thriller film written and directed by Vinayan and starring Suresh Gopi and Meena in lead roles. The film also features Mukesh, Karthika, Rajan P Dev, Indrans, Harisree Ashokan, Jagadeesh, Nedumudi Venu, Ashish Vidhyarthi and Thilakan in supporting roles.

Plot
The story is about Black, a fisherman who is loved by all in his village even though a mentally ill person. He is also the security of Tharakan Muthalali, a famous marine food exporter and is cared for by his daughter Blessy, who values Black's friendship. Caesar and George Washington are his two supportive friends who were also Tharakan's securities. Varkechan, Tharakan's brother, is not at all happy with Black's eating styles and rebuked him once for eating in his house. Black continues his childish behaviour and is called by Caesar to accompany Pathrose Moopen to have more food. Later Tharakan receives a call from Prabhul Kumar from Mumbai regarding the arrival of his daughter Meenakshi to Tharakan's village.

When Meenakshi is happily shooting the video of festivals as a tribute to her, she gets shocked upon seeing Black, a person who looks exactly like Ramesh Sharma IPS, her lover who she presumes to have died in an accident. Still suspicious, she decides to find more about Black and finally confirms that Black is Ramesh. After staying for a few days in Tharakan's house, Meenakshi moves to the house of Moosath, a powerful sorcerer and decides to bring Black back as Ramesh. Black is first impressed by Meenakshi, thanks to the cologne she wears. Tharakan drops Black at Moosath's house for a Pooja without any knowledge of Meenakshi's plans. Black resists initially, but patiently prepares for the Pooja and within days changes to a different personality. Meenakshi, who is eagerly waiting to see her Ramesh, gets an unexpected result from Moosath that the person is not Ramesh but Black although Meenakshi firmly believes that he is Ramesh. It comes true when he reminisces his fight between Prabhul Kumar, DGP Aggarwal and Prabhul's elder brother Prakash.

When he reaches Tharakan's house, everyone is surprised by his changed behaviour and Tharakan decides to find the truth behind Black's change in his behavior. Confused by the languages used by villagers, he sees a video shown by Blessy and gets an idea of it. When Pathrose brings him food, he refuses which surprises Pathrose.

Black moves to Mumbai as Ramesh after a gap of ten years to find his enemies and kill them. To get more information about his family, Ramesh consults his friend Dinesh from whom he learns that his mother and one sister are dead. His other sister, Shyama is taken care of by Dinesh and his wife. On his way, he reminisces about an incident where he fights Prabhul and team to save his sisters but gets beaten up by them and loses his sanity. After killing Prakash and Aggarwal, he returns to Tharakan's village in Kerala and gets arrested by Vikram Dharma IPS who was sent by Prabhul Kumar from Mumbai. The next day he is taken to court, and Ramesh brilliantly acts as Black in front of the Judge and the prosecutor. The prosecutor argues that the person is Ramesh Sharma and not Black. Dinesh then brilliantly acts with the evidence regarding the death of Ramesh Sharma and further establishes that he is Black. When the prosecutor does not give up, the judge postpones the verdict.

The next day Moosath and Meenakshi also come to the court and informs them that the accused is Black and not Ramesh. Dinesh once again proves that the person standing in the court is Black and hence gets Black exonerated. Ramesh then informs Dinesh about his plan to kill Prabhul Kumar, who ruined his life. Meenakshi begs Ramesh to not kill Prabhul as he is her father but Ramesh was firm on his decision. However, he gets beaten up by some goons outside the court. Tharakan and his gang manages to save him.

Enraged, Tharakan and his relatives go to Prabhul Kumar's house to seek revenge for trying to kill Black. On seeing him, Meenakshi gets shocked as Moosath earlier informed her that if he gets hit on the head once again, he could never be brought back as Ramesh. To test whether he is Black or Ramesh, Prabhul Kumar slaps Shyama and Blessy badly. As he does not react in both the cases, Prabhul confirms that he is insane and tells Tharakan to take him back. Tharakan angrily threatens Prabhul and takes Black away. However, when Prabhul learns that Meenakshi knew of his role on assaulting Ramesh, he orders Vikram to kill Ramesh. As Prabhul is about to shoot Ramesh, he is blocked by Ramesh and killed in an ensuing fight.

Black is produced at court once again. However, the court lets him walk away. Everyone is still upset as they think that Ramesh has lost his regained memory. But Ramesh reveals the truth behind his actions. He also learns that Blessy is aware of his real identity and story. The film ends as Ramesh completely changes as Black Cat and is greeted by Tharakan and his gang.

Cast

Suresh Gopi as Commissioner Ramesh Sharma IPS / Black
Meena as Dr. Meenakshi
Mukesh as Adv. Dinesh
Karthika as Blessy Tharakan
Rajan P. Dev as Tharakan Muthalali
Nedumudi Venu as Pathrose Mooppan
Indrans as George Washington
Harisree Asokan as Ceaser
Jagadish as Vakkachan
Ashish Vidhyarthi as Prabhul Kumar
Thilakan as Moosath
Chali Pala as Advocate Krishnamoorthy
Bheeman Raghu as DYSP Vikram Dharma IPS
Mukesh Rishi as ADGP Aggarwal IPS
Ramu as Prakash Kumar
Ponnamma Babu as Nancy, Tharakan’s wife
Jaffar Idukki as Paili
Kulappulli Leela as Kathreena
Baburaj as Philipose
Saju Kodiyan as Mruthyumjayan Namboothiri
 Kalabhavan Santhosh as Bheemasenan
 Geetha Nair as Ramesh's mother
Sajitha Betti as Shyama, Ramesh's sister
Dimple Rose as Sharanya, Ramesh's sister
Geetha Salam as Shankaran
Jayan Cherthala as Muthaliyar
Machan Varghese as Chacko, a fisherman
Ravi Vallathol as Justice Chandran Menon
Jagannatha Varma as Justice Jayachandra Kurup
Kollam Thulasi as Gopalakrishnan Menon, Prosecutor
Abu Salim as C I Kishore

Soundtrack

Release
The film had a delayed release.

References

External links

Black Cat (Malayalam)

2007 films
2000s Malayalam-language films
Indian action thriller films
Films scored by Alphons Joseph
Films scored by M. Jayachandran
2007 action thriller films
Films directed by Vinayan